Duțescu is a surname. Notable people with the surname include: 

Dan Duţescu (1918–1992), Romanian professor of English language and literature
Roberto Dutesco (born Duțescu, 1961), Romanian-born Canadian artist, photographer, and filmmaker

Romanian-language surnames